Cap Djinet is a cape at the Mediterranean Sea near the town of Djinet, 50 kilometers east of Algiers, near Dellys, in the Boumerdès Province of Algeria.

A moment magnitude scale ( 6.8) earthquake in northern Algeria on May 21, 2003 produced a shoreline uplift characterized by a continuous white band visible at rocky headlands. The uplift distribution indicated an average of .55 meters along the shoreline with a maximum of .75 m near Boumerdes and a minimum close to 0 near Cap Djinet.

On June 4, 2008 were killed 6 soldiers and 4 wounded at Cap Djinet during an attack attributed to islamic militants. The troops were returning to their barracks when their vehicle was hit by a roadside bomb.

References

Geography of Boumerdès Province
Landforms of Algeria
Headlands of Africa
Landforms of the Mediterranean Sea